Automeris styx is a species of moth of the family Saturniidae. It was discovered by Claude Lemaire in 1982. It is found in northern South American counties including Peru, French Guiana, Ecuador and Bolivia.

References 

Insects described in 1982
Hemileucinae